Felix Kerber (born 25 October 2002) is an Austrian professional footballer who plays as a forward for FC Dornbirn, on loan from WSG Tirol.

Career statistics

Club

References

2002 births
Living people
Austrian footballers
Association football forwards
Austrian Football Bundesliga players
2. Liga (Austria) players
WSG Tirol players
FC Dornbirn 1913 players
People from Hall in Tirol
Footballers from Tyrol (state)